A jack post (telepost, adjustable steel column) is a steel post used in the construction trades for temporary support of ceilings, walls and trenches (shoring). They are designed to be able to mechanically telescope to about twice their shortest length in order to span a wide variety of spaces. Most examples use removable pins for coarse adjustment and a jack screw for fine adjustments, but many variations exist.

Terminology
The term "jack post" is one of many describing the same system. Other names include any assortment of "adjustable", "steel", "jack" and "shoring" with "post", "column" and "prop", depending on their precise construction - the "jack" refers to examples with a jack screw to adjust the precise length of the post. They are also known by any number of trade names, notably "Lally column" and "Acrow prop". Jack posts are widely standardized.

Description

Jack posts are telescopic tubular steel props consisting of two primary parts, the main part of the post, and the jack screw or other adjustable fitting on one or both ends. Both ends are normally fitted with flat metal plates on the end, providing additional support area. A recent improvement to Acrow props was to shape this baseplate with notches, allowing pallet loads of horizontal props to be stacked neatly, rather than randomly piled.

Most jack posts are split in two near the middle, with the upper end carrying the jack designed to slide within the lower portion. Gross adjustment for length is first made by pulling a pin and sliding the two sections within each other until they almost fill the gap, inserting the pin to lock them, then using the screw to close any remaining gap. Other designs used two threaded pipes instead of sliding sections, ratechetting or clamping sections, or other similar concepts to lock the system at a specific length.

Jack posts are mostly used for shoring: temporary supports during building repair or alteration work, rather than scaffolding: access platforms for workers. A typical use is to support an existing horizontal beam while its original masonry supports are removed or repaired. When masonry itself is to be supported, holes are first knocked through the brickwork and a strong 'needle' or 'strongboy' is placed through the hole. A pair of props are then used, one under each end. Existing windows or doorways may also be supported directly, or via needles. As the plates on the end of the posts are typically small, they offer little sideways support. If there is any sideways force, props should be strutted or 'laced' with scaffolding poles.

British Standard 
Metal props, their size, strength and construction, are now described by a British Standard BS4074. A similar lightweight European prop design exists, these have a maximum capacity of only .

Props are made in a range of five BS standard sizes:

The safe load for each prop depends upon the size and extension of the prop. Size 1, 2 and 3 props can take about 34 kN unextended, dropping progressively to less than half of that when fully extended. Size 0 props can take at least 23 kN, whereas size 4 props at most 20 kN dropping to 7 kN at their maximum extension. Props must be loaded concentrically, i.e. vertically for simple weights, to within 25mm.

Notes

References 

Construction equipment